Romualdas Zigmovich Juška (born 1 February 1942) is a retired Lithuanian football player and referee from the Soviet era.

Football career
From 1959 to 1973, Juška was an active footballer who played as a forward. In 1970, during his second stint at FK Žalgiris, he was named Lithuanian Footballer of the Year.

Refereeing career
In 1975, Juška passed the referee exam and began officiating in the Soviet Top League. In 1979, he was appointed as a FIFA referee representing the Football Federation of the Soviet Union.

In 1984, he was appointed as a referee for UEFA Euro 1984, where he officiated a group stage match between West Germany and Portugal.

Juška stopped officiating internationally in 1985, before retiring from refereeing in 1995.

References

External links
 
 Referee profile at worldfootball.net

1942 births
Living people
People from Šilalė District Municipality
Soviet footballers
Lithuanian footballers
Association football forwards
FK Žalgiris players
SKA Lviv players
PFC CSKA Moscow players
FC Metalist Kharkiv players
Soviet football referees
Lithuanian football referees
UEFA Euro 1984 referees